The Politics of Ningxia Autonomous Region in the People's Republic of China is structured in a dual party-government system like all other governing institutions in mainland China. 

The Chairman of the Autonomous Region is the highest-ranking official in the People's Government of Ningxia. However, in the Autonomous Region's dual party-government governing system, the Chairman has less power than the Chinese Communist Party (CCP) Ningxia Committee Secretary, colloquially termed the "Ningxia CCP Party Chief".

List of the CCP Ningxia Committee secretaries
Pan Zili (潘自力): November 1949–1951
Zhu Min (朱敏): 1951–1952
Li Jinglin (李景林): 1953–1954
Liu Geping (刘格平): 1957–1958
Wang Feng (汪锋): 1958-1958
Li Jinglin (李景林): 1958–1959
Wang Feng (汪锋): 1959–1961
Yang Jingren (杨静仁): 1961–1967
Kang Jianmin (康健民): 1970–1977
Huo Shilian (霍士廉): 1977–1979
Li Xuezhi (李学智): 1979–1986
Shen Daren (沈达人): 1986–1989
Huang Huang (黄璜): 1989–1997
Mao Rubai (毛如柏): 1997–2002
Chen Jianguo (陈建国): 2002–2010
Zhang Yi (张毅): 2010–2013
Li Jianhua: 2013–2017
Shi Taifeng: 2017–2019
Chen Run'er: 2019–2022
Liang Yanshun(梁言顺): 2022-present

List of chairmen of Ningxia Government
Pan Zili (潘自力): 1949–1951
Xing Zhaotang (邢肇棠): 1951–1954
Liu Geping (刘格平): 1958–1960
Yang Jingren (杨静仁): 1960–1967
Kang Jianmin (康健民): 1968–1977
Huo Shilian (霍士廉): 1977.01–1979
Ma Xin (马信): 1979–1982.
Hei Boli (黑伯理): 1982–1987
Bai Lichen (白立忱): 1986–1997
Ma Qizhi (马启智): 1997–2007
Wang Zhengwei (王正伟): 2007–2013
Liu Hui (刘慧): 2013–2016
Xian Hui (咸辉): 2016–2022
Zhang Yupu (张雨浦): 2022–incumbent

List of chairmen of Ningxia People's Congress
Ma Qingnian (马青年):1980–1987
Hei Boli (黑伯理): 1987–1988
Ma Sizhong (马思忠): 1988–1998
Ma Rubai (毛如柏): 1998–2002
Chen Jianguo (陈建国):2002–2010
Zhang Yi: (张毅): 2010–2013
Li Jianhua: 2013–2017
Shi Taifeng: 2017–2019
Chen Run'er: 2019–2022
Zhang Yupu (张雨浦): 2022-present

List of chairmen of CPPCC Ningxia Committee
Li Jinglin (李景林): 1958–1967
Yang Jingren (杨静仁): 1977–1978
Wang Jinzhang (王金璋): 1980–1985
Li Yunhe (李恽和): 1985–1993
Liu Guofan (刘国范): 1993–1998
Ma Sizhong (馬思忠): 1998–2001
Ren Qixing (任启兴): 2001 – January 2008
Xiang Zongxi (项宗西): January 2008–2013
Qi Tongsheng (齐同生): 2013-2018
Cui Po (崔波): 2018-2023
Chen Yong (陈雍): 2023-present

Ningxia
Ningxia
Indigenous politics